No. 158 Helicopter Unit is a Helicopter Unit and is equipped with Mil Mi-17V5 and based at Phalodi Air Force Station. It is Indian.

History

Assignments

Aircraft
Mil Mi-17V5

References

158